IBC Balita Ngayon was a late-night newscast of IBC 13 in the Philippines. It aired from July 13, 1998, to February 18, 2000, replacing CTN Midnite and was replaced by Ronda Trese.

Anchors
Manuel Llige (1998-2000)
Ida Marie Bernasconi (1998-1999)
Alice Noel (1999-2000)

Segments
Pangunahing Balita
Malayang Kalakalan
Palaro Hotline
Pulsong Pinoy
Daloy ng Panahon
Balik Tanaw

See also
List of programs previously broadcast by Intercontinental Broadcasting Corporation
IBC News and Public Affairs
Pulso: Aksyon Balita
RPN NewsWatch Prime Cast
GMA Network News

Philippine television news shows
1990s Philippine television series
2000s Philippine television series
1998 Philippine television series debuts
2000 Philippine television series endings
Filipino-language television shows
IBC News and Public Affairs
Intercontinental Broadcasting Corporation original programming
Intercontinental Broadcasting Corporation news shows